Dom Expedito Lopes is a municipality in the state of Piauí in the Northeast region of Brazil.

The name is a homage to the Catholic bishop Francisco Expedito Lopes (1914-1957).

See also
List of municipalities in Piauí

References

Municipalities in Piauí